Deep Purple in Concert is a live album by the English hard rock band Deep Purple, recorded by the BBC for their "In Concert" live series in 1970 and 1972. First released in 1980 in the UK, with the current US edition being made available in 2001.

Album content
Sides 1 and 2 of the LP (later the first CD) feature the live recording from the BBC Studios in London on 19 February 1970; the band stepped in at the last minute for Joe Cocker, who cancelled his scheduled appearance. DJ John Peel introduced the tracks as they were performed. Sides 3 and 4 of the LP (later the second CD) are the gig from 9 March 1972, this time with DJ Mike Harding as compere. The latter recording features the only known live recording of "Never Before" (it was out as a single at the time) and a rare Mk II line-up (Ian Gillan, Ritchie Blackmore, Jon Lord, Roger Glover and Ian Paice) offering of "Maybe I'm a Leo". These two songs were played instead of the usual "Child in Time" to promote the new forthcoming album Machine Head, released at the end of that month (March, 1972).

"Smoke on the Water" (the first ever live performance) and "Maybe I'm a Leo" were not included on the original double LP vinyl release in 1980, although "Smoke on the Water" was made available as a single release. The vinyl was housed in a gatefold-sleeve with photo-liners.

Reissues
The track lengths on many of the 2001 reissues are incorrect.

In 2004, the contents of the second disc were remastered and released on SACD as Live on the BBC, on Audio Fidelity, with two bonus tracks (studio versions of "Hush" and "River Deep Mountain High").

In 2012, the contents of the second disc were remixed and released as In Concert '72, with the original set list in its correct order for the first time. It was not quite the full recording, as some between-song chat was cut, presumably for timing purposes. No music was lost.

Track listing
All songs written by Ritchie Blackmore, Ian Gillan, Roger Glover, Jon Lord and Ian Paice except where indicated.

Original EMI double vinyl LP

2001 double-disc CD and 2012 reissue CD

 "Speed King" and "Smoke on the Water" are on this CD release
 "Black Night", "Bird Has Flown" and "Grabsplatter" can be found on Listen, Learn, Read On

Personnel
Deep Purple
Ritchie Blackmore – electric guitar
Ian Gillan – vocals
Roger Glover – bass guitar
Jon Lord – hammond organ
Ian Paice – drums

 Sides 1 and 2 of the LP (later the first CD) were recorded on 19 February 1970 at the BBC Studios for "The Sunday Show"
 Produced by Jeff Griffin
 Engineered by Tony Wilson
 Mono recording reprocessed for stereo

 Sides 3 and 4 of the LP (later the second CD) were recorded on 9 March 1972 at the Paris Theatre in London for "BBC Sounds of the Seventies"
 Produced by Pete Dauncey
 Engineered by Adrian Revill
 Editing by Nick Tauber
 Mixed from original 8-track master tapes in 1980 by Nick Tauber

Charts

References

External links
 Deep Purple in Concert

BBC Radio recordings
1980 live albums
Deep Purple live albums
Harvest Records live albums
Purple Records live albums